Karl Friedrich Walch (1734–July 20, 1799) was a German legal scholar.

Biography
Walch was a son of German theologian Johann Georg Walch.  He devoted himself to the study of law, and became professor of law at the University of Jena in 1759. His most important works were Introductio in controversias juris civilis recentioris (Jena, 1771) and Geschichte der in Deutschland geltenden Rechte (Jena, 1780).

References
 

German legal scholars
1734 births
1799 deaths